The men's freestyle BMX is an event at the annual UCI Urban Cycling World Championships.

Medalists

Freestyle Park

Freestyle Flatland

Medals by country

References

External links
UCI BMX Freestyle page

UCI Urban Cycling World Championships